The first heat of the men's 100 metres race was the first event run at the modern Olympics, on 6 April 1896. The event consisted of 3 heats and a final, held on 10 April. The 100 metres was the shortest race on the Athletics at the 1896 Summer Olympics programme. 15 athletes from 8 nations competed. The event was won by Thomas Burke of the United States. Fritz Hofmann of Germany took second, with Hungarian Alajos Szokolyi and American Francis Lane (who had won the first heat) tying for third. These competitors are recognized as gold, silver, and bronze medalists by the International Olympic Committee, though that award system had not yet been implemented in 1896.

Background

Fritz Hofmann was probably the most prominent sprinter to enter the event; he had won the 1893 Championship of the Continent. Thomas Burke was the American champion in the 400 metres but had not distinguished himself yet in the 100 metres. Absent were top sprinters American Bernie Wefers and Englishman Charles Bradley.

Competition format

21 athletes were entered in the first round, divided into three heats of seven runners, but six of them later withdrew. The top two athletes in each heat advanced to the final.

Records

This was the standing world record (in seconds) prior to the 1896 Summer Olympics.

The following new Olympic record was set during this competition:

In the first heat, Francis Lane set the inaugural Olympic Record of 12.2 seconds, tied in Heat 2 by Thomas Curtis. Thomas Burke then ran 11.8 seconds, which stood as the Olympic Record until the 1900 Olympics.

Schedule

The precise times of the events are not recorded. For the first round, the heats began shortly after the arrival of King George I of Greece at 3 p.m. and the brief opening ceremony. The final was the first competition of the afternoon session on Friday.

Results

Heats

The first round of heats took place on 6 April. The first heat of the 100 metres was the first competition held in the Games. Francis Lane won the first heat, thus becoming the first winner of a modern Olympic race. All heats were won by athletes from the United States.

Heat 1

The Official Report states that there were a total of 21 competitors, divided into three groups; there should therefore have been 7 athletes in each heat. The Official Report names only the top two runners, Lane and Szokolyi. Butler writes that the first heat had "two Hungarians, a Chilian, a Frenchman, a German, an Englishman and an American." Mallon & Widlund list Lane, Szokolyi, Gmelin, Grisel, and Doerry. Megede places André Tournois as the French competitor, rather than Grisel (who Megede does not list at all), omits Doerry (who Megede puts in heat 2), and includes Leonidasz Manno and Luis Subercaseaux. Olympedia follows Mallon & Widlund, also including Manno, Tournois, and Subercaseaux in a list of non-starters not attached to particular heats (this list includes 12 athletes, bringing Olympedia's total entrants to 27 rather than 21).

Heat 2

The Official Report states that there were a total of 21 competitors, divided into three groups; there should therefore have been 7 athletes in each heat. The Official Report names only the top two runners, Curtis and Chalkokondylis. Butler writes of the second heat that Curtis beat "a Greek, an Englishman, two Frenchmen, a Dane, and a Hungarian." Mallon & Widlund list Curtis, Chalkokondylis, Elliot, Schmidt, and Marshall. Megede places Alexandre Tuffère as the French competitor, including him at 3rd place above Elliott; Megede also has Kurt Doerry in this heat instead of the first one (indicating he started but did not finish the heat) and omits Marshall entirely. Olympedia follows Mallon & Widlund, also including Tuffère in a list of non-starters not attached to particular heats. Other non-starters listed by Olympedia that could be a second Frenchman or a Hungarian to match Butler's list are André Tournois, Louis Adler, István Zachar, and Nándor Dáni.

Heat 3

Both Burke and Hofmann were more well known for middle-distance events rather than sprinting. Burke's time of 11.8s became the standing Olympic record. It is not clear which athlete received which place between the fourth and fifth finishers.

The Official Report states that there were a total of 21 competitors, divided into three groups; there should therefore have been 7 athletes in each heat. The Official Report names only the top two runners, "an American (Burke)" and Hofmann. Butler writes of the final heat that Burke beat "a Swede, two Greeks, and three Germans." Mallon & Widlund list Burke, Hofmann, Traun, Gennimatas, and Sjöberg. Megede omits Traun, places Sjöberg 3rd and Gennimatas 5th, and includes Nándor Dáni at 4th. Olympedia follows Mallon & Widlund; non-starters (not attached to particular heats in Olympedia) include Flatow and Mouratis.

Final

The final of the 100 metre race, run on 10 April, involved the six runners who had finished in the top two of their preliminary heats. Thomas Curtis withdrew to save himself for the 110 metre hurdles, which was the next race on the program and which he won. Burke beat his companion from the third heat, Hofmann, by two meters. Lane and Szokolyi dead-heated for third place, with Chalkokondylis six inches behind them. Lane and Szokolyi are both considered to be bronze medallists by the International Olympic Committee.

Results summary

References

  (Digitally available at la84foundation.org)
  (Excerpt available at la84foundation.org)
 
 

Men's 0100 metres
100 metres at the Olympics